Artur Hovhannisyan (born 23 March 1996) is an Armenian amateur boxer. He competed in the men's light-flyweight event at the 2016 Summer Olympics.

References

External links
 

1996 births
Living people
Armenian male boxers
Olympic boxers of Armenia
Boxers at the 2016 Summer Olympics
Place of birth missing (living people)
Boxers at the 2019 European Games
European Games medalists in boxing
European Games gold medalists for Armenia
Light-flyweight boxers
21st-century Armenian people